Lionel Ziprin (November 20, 1924 – March 15, 2009) was a poet who lived on the Lower East Side of Manhattan, New York. He was also a grandson of the renowned Orthodox rabbi Nuftali Zvi Margolies Abulafia, who recorded a 15-LP set of Jewish liturgical music in a neighborhood yeshiva during the 1950s with noted ethnomusicologist Harry Smith.

Biography
Born on the Lower East Side of Manhattan, Ziprin spent most of his life attempting to find a large record label to distribute these recordings, which did not receive much attention until a New Year's Day story about his quest was broadcast on National Public Radio. Following the broadcast, several prominent individuals — including the musician John Zorn — expressed an interest in finding a mainstream distributor for his grandfather's recordings.

Ziprin married Joanna Eashe in 1950 and had two daughters and two sons from this marriage. His wife died in 1994.

Ziprin wrote comic book scripts for Dell Comics in the mid-1960s, including issues of Kona Monarch of Monster Isle and several stories depicting combat during World War II.

Kabbalah
Ziprin was a kabbalist since before the 1960s, prior to even returning to Orthodoxy. He later shifted to a more ultra-Orthodox mode of Jewish observance. At times, he provided one-on-one tutoring for those who needed his assistance. Through kabbalah, Ziprin helped at least a few individuals gain insight into their problems.

At least one of his lessons was based on the pentagram and its relation to kabbalah. According to Ziprin, the pentagram is the key to figuring out a magic square which possesses an odd number of squares, and thus is heavily integrated in Jewish mysticism and numerology. It is because of this that King Solomon's battle shield was purportedly emblazoned with this design. Below is a step-by-step explanation of how the pentagram is the solution key, along with two magic squares exhibiting the proper placement of numbers to form the solution, following the various steps and alternatives.

As depicted in the diagram at right, the first number should be placed in the center square of the top row.
The next number is placed diagonally up towards the right, correlating with the first line drawn in a pentagram.  Because this is an invalid option (because the number 1 is in the top row), the alternative is to proceed to the lowest available square one column to the right, corresponding the second drawn line of a pentagram.
 The next member is, as before, placed diagonally up and towards the right.  However, because this is again an invalid option, and the alternative is also invalid (because we are in the right-most column), the secondary alternative is placed in the left-most square one row up, corresponding with the third drawn line of a pentagram.

The next number is, as before, placed diagonally up and towards the right. However, because this spot is taken, the alternative is to place the number in the bottom-most square of the same row, corresponding to the fourth drawn line of a pentagram. Note that this does not follow the invalid rule above, because whereas before there was no square present, this time the diagonally related square exists but is occupied. This corresponds to the fourth drawn line of a pentagram.
Should this last placement rule not be executable because the lowest square in the column to the right be occupied, the number is to be placed in the bottom-most square of the same column. This corresponds to the fifth and final drawn line of a pentagram.

The five line segments mentioned above will form a pentagram if their end-points are drawn as follows. Draw the circle with clock-face numbers around the periphery, outside of the circle. Now, within the circle, and making all points on the circumference, make a point at 7 o'clock. Draw a line to connect it to a dot at 12:30. Then draw a line from there to connect it to a point at 4 o'clock. Then draw a line to 9 o'clock. Then draw a line from there to connect to 2 o'clock. If 2 o'clock is connected with the initial 7 o'clock, a pentagram is produced. Each line drawn corresponds to the step or alternative or secondary alternative, etc. when attempting to place the next consecutive number within a magic square.

Ziprin died on March 15, 2009, due to complications of chronic obstructive pulmonary disease.

Cultural references
The character "Lionel Abulafia" in the novel The Cabalist's Daughter by Yori Yanover was inspired by Lionel Ziprin. In the novel, Abulafia is a 130-year-old rabbi with mystical powers.

Lionel Ziprin is also the subject of a 10 minute black and white film 'HATS', made by the British post war modernist artist, Pip Benveniste in 1970. In this film he opens and closes a suitcase full of his hat collection and, straight to camera on a run down New York roof top, he puts on and then takes off each hat in turn. The sound track is the recorded Kabbalistic chanting of Ziprin's grandfather, the rabbi Reb N Z Margolies Abulafia.

References

Online resources
Lionel Ziprin's website

Sources
Kalish, Jon. A Grandson's Quest to Preserve His Jewish Heritage on NPR Weekend Edition, January 1, 2006.
Kalish, Jon. A Beatnik Finds Treasure In His Grandfather's Beats in The Jewish Daily Forward, January 27, 2006.
Kalish, Jon. Rabbi Abulafia's Boxed Set in fiba 2006.
Evanier, Mark. From the E-Mailbag...

External links
 David Katz, "‘Angels are just one more species’ - David Katz meets Lionel Ziprin, mystic, maven and maverick of New York’s Lower East Side", Jewish Quarterly, Number 204, Winter 2006/2007.
 New York Times obituary, March 20, 2009.

1924 births
2009 deaths
Poets from New York (state)
American Orthodox Jews
20th-century American poets